Almost a Honeymoon is a 1930 British comedy film directed by Monty Banks and starring Clifford Mollison, Dodo Watts and Donald Calthrop. It was based on the play Almost a Honeymoon by Walter Ellis. A second adaptation was made in 1938. It was made by British International Pictures at their Elstree Studios.

Premise
An ambitious young man secures a job in the colonial service, the only stipulation being that he needs to be married which he isn't. He has just twenty four hours to find a woman to persuade to marry him.

Cast
 Clifford Mollison as Basil Dibley
 Dodo Watts as Rosalie Quilter
 Lamont Dickson as Cuthbert de Gray
 Donald Calthrop as Charles, the butler
 C. M. Hallard as Sir James Jephson
 Winifred Hall as Lavinia Pepper
 Pamela Carme as Margaret Brett
 Edward Thane as Clutterbuck

Critical reception
Allmovie noted that "Donald Calthrop, as the butler, has all the best lines."

See also
The Man at Midnight (1931)

References

External links

1930 films
1930 comedy films
Films shot at British International Pictures Studios
1930s English-language films
Films directed by Monty Banks
British comedy films
British multilingual films
British black-and-white films
1930 multilingual films
1930s British films